The Hunger and Other Stories is the first collection of short stories by American writer Charles Beaumont, published in April 1957. A British edition was published in 1964 under the title Shadow Play. In 2013 Valancourt Books released the first new edition in nearly 50 years.

Stories collected

Reception
Anthony Boucher praised Beaumont for his portrayal of "an eery uncertain world of unexpected terrors and betrayals," although he faulted the story selection in The Hunger for including "a few items weak in either concept or execution"; Boucher concluded, however, that the volume included "enough wholly admirable stories to make the book worth every reader's while."

References

American short story collections
Fantasy short story collections
1957 short story collections